Frank Lawson John Jackson (12 June 1919 – 29 March 1976) was a British Conservative politician who served as a Member of Parliament (MP) from 1959 to 1964.

Jackson unsuccessfully contested the Labour-held marginal constituency of  South East Derbyshire at the 1955 general election, losing by 1,581 votes to the sitting Labour MP Arthur Champion. At the 1959 general election, he defeated Champion, taking the seat with a majority of only 12 votes.

Jackson did not contest the seat at the 1964 general election, when Trevor Park gained South East Derbyshire for Labour. Jackson never returned to the House of Commons.

References
Richard Kimber's political science resources: UK General Elections since 1832

External links

1919 births
1976 deaths
Conservative Party (UK) MPs for English constituencies
UK MPs 1959–1964